
This is a list of the 40 players who earned their 2007 PGA Tour card through Q School in 2006.

2007 Results

*PGA Tour rookie in 2007
T = Tied 
Green background indicates the player retained his PGA Tour card for 2008 (finished inside the top 125). 
Yellow background indicates the player did not retain his PGA Tour card for 2008, but retained conditional status (finished between 126-150). 
Red background indicates the player did not retain his PGA Tour card for 2008 (finished outside the top 150).

Winners on the PGA Tour in 2007

Runners-up on the PGA Tour in 2007

See also
2006 Nationwide Tour graduates

References
Qualifiers
Player profiles
Money list

PGA Tour Qualifying School
PGA Tour Qualifying School Graduates
PGA Tour Qualifying School Graduates